is a 2015 Japanese anime film produced by Shin-Ei Animation. It is the 23rd film of the popular comedy manga and anime series Crayon Shin-chan. It was released on 18 April 2015 in Japanese theatres. It is directed by Masakazu Hashimoto, who also directed the 21st movie Very Tasty! B-class Gourmet Survival!!. The screenplay was written by Ueno Kimiko.

Plot
Hiroshi is ordered to collect the fruit of cactus and is transferred to Mexico. So, Nohara family is forced to move to Mexico and live there. They bid farewell to their acquaintances and the citizens of Kasukabe in tears. Shinchan heard that Mexican young girls are stylish and beautiful and became eager for this journey.
On arriving at Madakueruyobaka city in Mexico, a new life full of anxiety, surrounded by unique neighbours awaits them.
But Shinnosuke and Nohara family had no idea that flesh-eating killer cactuses are going to attack.

Now it is up to Nohara family along with the neighbours of Mexico to overcome this trouble.

In Mexico, in the town of Madakueruyobaka (fictional place), a new species of cactus was discovered. From the bud of the cactus, delicious and sweet honey could be made. Futaba Shouji, the company where Hiroshi worked, had put an eye on this. The company saw this as a business opportunity; it wanted to import and sell this commodity in Japan and outside. So, the company decided to open a branch office in Madakueruyobaka. Hiroshi was made the president of the Madaukeruyobaka branch, and was ordered transfer to Mexico.

Hiroshi had initially decided to go alone. But his wife Misae strongly opposed this. She argued that it would hamper the growth of their children, and said that a family is useless if it is not together. So it was decided that Hiroshi would move to Mexico with his family together.

At Futaba Kindergarten, Miss Yoshinaga announced that Shinnosuke would be leaving Kasukabe and moving to Mexico, which shocked everyone. All the Kasukabe Defense Group members expressed sorrow, except Kazama-kun who pretended that he's not sad and remained calm. Ai-chan, who has a crush on Shin-chan, cried for him.

Shinchan realized that he would separated from Nanako. He said that, "I will remain in Kasukabe. I shall marry Nanako and live in Kasukabe". But when Shinnosuke was told that Mexican girls are beautiful and glamorous, he decided to go.

Nohara family packed their belongings, and their house appeared empty. They felt sad and nostalgic for leaving their house full of memories. Their luggage was transported before their actual departure.

On the day of leaving, all the people of Kasukabe came together to bid farewell to the Nohara family. The Kasukabe Defense Group had come with a KB (Kasukabe Boueitai) badge, and gave it to Shinnkosuke. They said that, "Wherever in the world you go, if you have this badge, you shall remain a Kasukabe Boueitai member". All members except Kazama-kun had arrived. Even the Saitama Red Scorpions, who considered Shin-chan a nuisance, had come.
The Nohara family took a taxi to Kasukabe station. From the station, they boarded a train to the International Airport. When the train moved, in the middle of a dry river, Kazama was seen running behind. Shinnosuke and Kazama both called each other's names, with tears, and Kazama still running behind the train. Finally they lifted their KB badge together and waved goodbye.

At the airport, Hiroshi was amazed at the speed of the airport crew. Huge aeroplanes could be seen landing and taking off. They boarded their flight to Mexico.
They finally arrived at Mexico. They stayed at the seaside resort, and took a long-distance bus to Madakueruyobaka. On reaching, they saw that it is a small and remote town, cut-off from the big cities, and isolated. From there, they meet José, the only employee from the Futaba Shouji's Mexico branch. José couldn't speak Japanese, except for few words and phrases. From his dialogue "zenzen daijoubu" (totally fine), Hiroshi and others mistook that he is fluent in Japanese. He took them to their new house. In the pamphlet given by the company, the house looked gorgeous and nice. But when they reached there, they saw that the house was only halfway made with brick walls and windows, looking tattered. They had to accept it, looking at the body language of José.

Nohara family begin their new life in Mexico. They quickly adapted to the surroundings. They adjusted to Mexican food, which was very different from their own Japanese food. They learnt Spanish, so as to be understood by the locals. They even wore the traditional Mexico attire.
Shinnosuke went to the local kindergarten, where he is smitten with his curvaceous teacher Carolina.

On the way, Shin-chan encountered a girl who was always busy with her smartphone. When he spoke to her, she ignored him and said, "Don't touch my phone, you potato-head". Shinnosuke named her "Sumaho-chan", though her real name was Fransisca.
The family also encountered two interesting locals. One was Nene Rodriguez, a masked professional Luchador wrestler. The other person was Mariachi, a man who loved singing and always played the guitar.

This town, in the old days, was poor in industry and many people had left in search of work. But thanks to the cactus, the town seemed to escape from crisis. The Mayor wanted to further develop the town and attempted to harvest and sell only to the locals. When Hiroshi met the Mayor to negotiate, he refused. He said that many outsiders are attracted to the sweet nectar of the cactus. He refused to sell the cactuses or permit business.
Meanwhile, in the square with the new cactus, a cactus festival was held. Shinnosuke wanted to dance with Carolina, so he insisted Hiroshi to take him to the festival. Everyone in the festival was having a nice time.

There was a huge cactus which was about to bloom. The people including the Mayor were waiting for it to flower. But immediately after blooming, it turns into a giant killer cactus. From this giant Queen Cactus, small killer cactuses were generated. They started swallowing the people one after the other. All the terrified people started running, with the cactuses chasing them and eating them up. The town was getting destroyed.
The cactus researcher, Ikegamino, said that cactuses have a strong regenerative power and it would be difficult to destroy them.

Nohara family including some residents, fled to one of the nearby bars. Hiroshi suggested that they should run out of the town, but no one cooperated fearing that they would be attacked by cactuses. At the bar they drank cola; there was no milk for Himawari. So Hiroshi decided to get some from the closest supermarket. Sumaho-chan accompanied him, in order to get a charger for her smartphone. But when they returned, the killer cactus also reached the bar and started eating people. So they had to escape again.
Meanwhile, their dog Shiro was left behind in their house in the town. Shiro bravely saved some stray dogs from the cactus attack.

Hiroshi bought a bus from the bus stop and the residents boarded it. But they got eaten up even on the way. The person who were alive were the Nohara family, the Mayor, Carolina, Fransisca, Nene Rodriguez, Mariachi and the Nihon Erekiteru Union. The Nihon Erekiteru Union is a comedy group of Japan, consisting of Hosogai-san and Akemi-chan. Hosogai-san was an officer and Akemi-chan was Chibikko. On the bus, they both got soon eaten up by cactuses. Chibikko said her famous lines "Dame yo, Dame Dame" (No, no), before getting eaten. The rest fought with the cactus. The bridge which lead out of the town was occupied by killer cactuses, so they had to turn back. Shinnosuke discovered that cactuses hit people by responding to sound. But soon the bus driver got eaten up and the bus crashed onto a mountain.

At the suggestion of the Mayor, the survivors escaped into the Cactus amusement park nearby. The park was still under construction. There was no food available. So they decided that they had no choice but to leave the town. But the Mayor was strongly opposed to this. They discovered dynamite in the prefabricated hut for construction workers. They made a plan to blow up the cactus in the town. The Mayor was again opposed to blow up cactus in the town. So they decided to blow the cactus outside the town. They tied dynamite to a vehicle called "Cactus Car", and from the nature of cactuses reacting to sound, the strategy was to take the cactus out of the town and blow them across the bridge. When the cactus followed the vehicle, a fruit of the cactus fell down. The tempted Mayor went to pick up the fruit but fell down and by mistake changed the direction of the vehicle. As a result, the vehicle blew up on the bridge itself. Thus, the only exit of the city was collapsed.

The cactus started attacking again. In order to escape, Hiroshi and Misae wandered. Shinnosuke and Mayor were left together. They planned to go back to the town to get food. The Mayor talks about the reconstruction of the town to Shinnosuke. According to him, Madakueruyobaka was a poor countryside town and he grew up in this town. Now since many people have left, the town is deserted like nothing. So he intends to use this new cactus species to revitalize the town.

Shinnosuke ate the food that was passed from the Mayor and wanted to have a pee. But it was forbidden by Mayor's law to stand and pee on the roads. So, he had to go into the fields to pee. While peeing, a small killer cactus came near him. Shinnosuke peed on the cactus. To his surprise, the cactus got wrinkled and died. He wondered if pee was the weakness of the cactus. He told this thing to the Mayor, who was still busy thinking of his revitalization plan. Then they all realized that the weakness of cactus is water.

They decided to defeat the killer cactus using water. But there was shortage of water in the city. At the suggestion of Carolina and Francisca, they decided to use the water of the water supply tank on Chichideka mountain. The Mayor was again opposed to use the water from the tank, but had to give up this time. He let out his anger on Sumaho-chan. Hiroshi's plan was to inject water into a playing balloon called "Sabo-chan", and throw it at the Queen Cactus.

The action started with the day after sunrise. The "Madakueruyobaka Defense Group" was formed. The Queen Cactus had grown into a huge monster. They were likely to be attacked during water injection, so someone had to play the role of decoy. Mariachi was chosen as the decoy and he asked help from Rainbow Kamen in fear. In their dedication, water was able to get filled in the Sabo-chan balloon. But suddenly the Queen Cactus which was stationary began to move, and attacked Mariachi and Rainbow Kamen. The Mayor could see his town getting destroyed. In order to help Mariachi and Rainbow Kamen, the hitherto uncooperative Mayor himself became the decoy. While he was busy distracting the cactus, Hiroshi rolled the water-filled Sabo-chan balloon down the mountain and it was thrown at the Queen Cactus. The balloon was supposed to be burst by the thorns of the cactus and water was supposed to spout. But, the Queen Cactus guarded the balloon with its tentacles which had no thorn and it didn't burst.

So, Shinnosuke took out the needle of the KB badge which he was wearing. Kazama-kun had made the needle as a safety pin of the KB badge. Shinnosuke had almost forgotten about its existence; and it proved to be very helpful at the right time. Then Shinnosuke ran with the needle in hand, jumped and pierced the balloon with it. The balloon got burst, with water spouting all over. The Queen cactus got exhausted, was defeated and got disappeared. Also, all  people which it had swallowed were alive and came out. The botanist Ikegamino gave the reason that carnivorous plants take time to digest the things they eat.

Peace returned to town and the Cactus Festival resumed. Shinnosuke was able to dance with Carolina which he had been waiting since long. The species of new cactus was never seen again. So, the Mexico branch of Futaba Shouji was shut down, and Hiroshi was recalled back to the headquarters in Japan. Everyone happily enjoyed at the Cactus Land amusement park.
Meanwhile, in Japan, Kazama received an international mail from Shinnosuke. There he had stated that since the new cactus doesn't exist anymore, they would be returning home soon. Kazama was overjoyed on reading this.

Finally the Nohara family returned to Kasukabe after their adventure in Mexico.

Cast
 Akiko Yajima as Shinnosuke Nohara
 Miki Narahashi as Misae Nohara
 Keiji Fujiwara as Hiroshi Nohara
 Satomi Korogi as Himawari Nohara
 Hiroaki Hirata as Mayor
 Kenyuu Horiuchi as Nene Rodriguez/Rainbow Kamen
 Daisuke Namikawa as Mariachi
 Maaya Sakamoto as Carolina

 Rino Sashihara as Sumaho-chan / Francisca 
 Akemi-chan as Akemi-chan, herself part of the laughter duo "Nippon Erekiteru Rengou" (Japan Elekitel Union)
 Hosogai-san as Hosogai-san himself (part of Nippon Erekiteru Rengou)

Production
This is the first time that the "Moving of Nohara Family" is the theme of the movie series. It is also the first time in four years that the Nohara Family goes abroad, their last being in the 19th movie Crayon Shin-chan: The Storm Called: Operation Golden Spy. It's the first time that a real country (Mexico) is depicted in the Crayon Shin-chan movie series after two fictional ones (Buriburi Kingdom in the 2nd movie and Sukashipesutan in the 19th movie). The story continued to expand based on the Nohara Family after they moved to a city in Mexico due to the relocation of Hiroshi. The theme of the movie is slightly similar to Crayon Shin-chan: The Storm Called: The Kasukabe Boys of the Evening Sun.

Two teasers of the movie were released on 12 and 14 December 2014, and the trailer on 6 March 2015.
Yūki Yoshida, the producer of Shin-Ei Animation said that he wanted to do things "that shake the larger setting", and wanted to bring more "panic elements" in the story.

This is the third longest running Crayon Shin-chan movie, having a running time of 104 minutes. This is the third time that a Crayon Shin-chan feature film has crossed 100 minutes of length, after the 2011 movie Crayon Shin-chan: The Storm Called: Operation Golden Spy (107 minutes) and the 2012 movie Crayon Shin-chan: The Storm Called!: Me and the Space Princess (111 minutes).

This is also the first time that many characters from the anime television, especially Keiko Honda (Misae's friend) and Musae Koyama (Misae's sister) have made their appearance in a Crayon Shin-chan film. 
On 30 January 2015, it was announced that Yuzu had been appointed to sing the theme song of the movie, titled OLA. Yuzu had been appointed for an anime OST for the first time in two years, the last time being in 2013 for the movie HUNTERxHUNTER -The LAST MISSION-. A short version of the song was used as the ending song for the anime television from 6 February till May 2015.

On 24 February 2015, it was announced that Rino Sashihara of HKT48 and the comedy duo Nippon Elekitel Union would appear as guest voice artists. It was the first time that the comedy duo worked for an animation film as voice actors. In addition, the announcer of TV Asahi, Natsumi Uga, appeared as the reporter for the cactus festival in the movie.

On 25 March 2015, an event called "Kasukabe Moving Ceremony" was held in Kasukabe City Hall to symbolize the Nohara family's moving. 
Three special episodes of the anime television related to the movie aired on 6 March (Wakai futari wa kōshite ie o katta zo), 17 April (Take no ko dai shūgeki da zo) and 1 May (Shiro no hikkoshi monogatari da zo) on TV Asahi in Japan.

Release in other countries 
This movie was released in Singapore theatres on 9 July 2015 with English and Chinese subtitles and having a PG-13 rating. In Spain the movie will be released on 25 May 2019 in Kinépolis Ciudad de la Imagen because Fox (Spain) has acquired the emission rights in 2019. This movie was released on Hungama TV on 30 April 2017 as Shinchan Movie Kaanta Lagaa.

This is the first Crayon Shin-chan film to be distributed by Odex in Singapore, Malaysia, and Brunei.

This movie was released in Italian theatres on TBA film to be distributed by Lucky Red.

Slogan
The slogan of the movie is "Thank You Kasukabe. Goodbye Kasukabe." (Arigatou Kasukabe. Sayounara Kasukabe.)

Theme Song

Opening Theme Song
Kimi ni 100 Percent (Warner Music Japan / unBORDE)
 Lyrics : Yasutaka Nakata
 Vocals: Kyary Pamyu Pamyu

Ending Theme Song
「OLA!!」 (SENHA & Co.)
 Lyrics: Kenichi Maeyamada
 Vocals: Yuzu

Characters Specific to the Movie

Madakueruyobaka City
It is the destination city of the Nohara Family which is located in Mouquenca State of Mexico. It is surrounded by steep cliffs and one has to cross a bridge to reach there.

Mayor of Madakueruyobaka
His real name is Duyaggo Eraindesu. He was born in Madakueruyobaka town which had been deserted. He has attempted to revitalize the city by drawing many tourists and companies with the discovery of the special cactus. But this was halted due to killer cactus. Initially he was obsessed with the cactus, but later helped others in defeating the Queen Cactus.

Nene Rodriguez/Rainbow Kamen
He is a masked Mexican Lucha Libre wrestler. He likes body building, and has a high-spirited good personality. But he is timid and coward. He is actually scared of fighting, often faking injuries like he has "hurt his knee", and doesn't go to the ring. When he was called a "sissy" by Sumaho-chan, in the wake of this comment, he fought the final battle along with Mariachi. After the cactus incident was resolved, he fought a battle with Luchador and won.

Mariachi
He is a Mexican man who always holds a guitar in one hand, and sings to show his love for beautiful things. Shinnosuke teased him by calling him "unemployed uncle". After being attacked by the killer cactus, he underwent an amazing transformation. He fought the final battle along with Rainbow Kamen, holding the guitar in his hand.

Carolina
She is the beautiful nursery teacher of the kindergarten which Shinnosuke attends in Mexico. She has a bright, friendly and caring personality. Shinnosuke becomes enamored with her due to her voluptuous body and suggestive dance moves. She bravely fought against the killer cactuses.

Sumaho-chan
Sumaho-chan (スマホちゃん, lit. "Smartphone Girl"), is a Mexican girl whom Nohara family first encounters in Mexico. She lived in the neighbourhood of the Nohara family's new house. Her real name is Francisca. Due to her adolescence, she has a bad mouth, is shy as well as moody. She is given this nickname by Shinnosuke, as she always cherishes her smartphone, holding it carefully while walking, and refusing to tell Shinnosuke her name. Her parents were preyed on by the killer cactus. In the final battle, she went to open the tap of the water tank pipe. She was reunited with her parents after the cactus had died.

Ikegamino
He is a cactus researcher and botanist who was invited to the Cactus festival. If asked any question, he always responds with "Ii shitsumon desu ne!" (It is a good question!). This is a parody of the Japanese journalist Akira Ikegami. He taught Shinnosuke about the carnivorous cactus plant. He was eaten up in the bus by the cactus.

Pub Owner
He is an elderly man with white hair. He gave shelter to the survivors in his shop. He gave cola to the exhausted Nohara family. When the cactus attacked, he fought with a shotgun, but was subsequently eaten.

Luchador
They are Mexican-style pro-wrestlers; the male athletes of Lucha Libre. Whenever they saw Nene Rodriguez, they used him as a gofer. They were eaten up by the killer cactus when they tried to fight with it in the ring.

José Mendokusē
He was the only employee of the Mexico branch of Futaba Shouji where Hiroshi was transferred. He has a habit of saying "Zenzen Daijoubu" (totally fine). Although he saved Nohara family using his three-wheeler, he was predated due to his carelessness.

Sheriff
He is the Sheriff of Madakueruyobaka. He always says what the town Mayor says to show his loyalty. When the killer cactus began to attack people, he shot it but soon got predated.

Meat Shop Manager
He was one of the survivors who fled to the pub. He checked the radio waves to verify whether the cellphone was alive or not. He also fought back with the killer cactus using his meat knife till they escaped to the bus.

Three Chihuahua Brothers
They are stray dogs whom Shiro met in Mexico. Initially they bullied Shiro and took away his food, but later became friends when he saved them from cactus.

Bus Driver
He is the driver of the bus that connects Madakueruyobaka to the urban areas. He plays Latin music while driving, and in this way he found that the cactuses respond to sound. While reading a Lucha Libre magazine at an unpopular bus stop, he was caught in the commotion. While he was driving away the survivors, he was predated by the killer cactus.

Uga Āna
She is a reporter of a Mexican TV station. She had come to Madakueruyobaka by helicopter for the coverage of the cactus festival. When the killer cactus attacked, she tried to escape in the helicopter, but the cactus responded to the helicopter's sound and she was eaten up.

Nihon Erekiteru Rengō
They are a comedy group of Japan who had come to Madakueruyobaka. Hosogai-san was soon eaten up by the killer cactus. Akemi-chan was eaten too, but since she was a robot, the cactus vomited her out.

Killer Cactus
It is the main villain of this movie. The new species of cactus was important to the town people as it had a fruit which resembled Dragon Fruit. But it soon turns into killer carnivorous cactus and starts eating people in the town centre. The Queen cactus moved using the roots and preyed by hearing sound. It has a strong vitality, and if cut can rejoin its parts by grafting. But its weakness was that it would wither when exposed to water. In the final battle, all the other killer cactuses merged with the Queen cactus. But it was defeated when Shinnosuke used the needle of his KB badge to burst the balloon which spouted water. The predated people were also safely released as it had not digested them yet.

From the setting of carnivorous plants eating traveling people, the influence of the Sci-Fi novel "The Day of the Triffids" has been pointed out.

Events
The Embassy of Mexico in Japan welcomed Shinnosuke Nohara who came to get a Mexican work visa, residence permit and voting card for his parents, symbolically, in his own hand by ambassador Carlos Almada.
Shinnosuke Nohara (costumed person) himself visited Mexico in reality to promote his movie. He visited various places including a school, a cactus forest, and a beach in Mexico.
A special screening of the movie was done in Mexico.

Reception
The film had grossed  on 29 June 2015 in Japan, thus becoming the highest grossing Crayon Shin-chan film of all time in 23 years, overtaking the 1993 movie Crayon Shin-chan: Action Kamen vs Leotard Devil which had grossed  by a small margin. The film grossed  on its opening in South Korea.

DVD and Blu-Ray
The DVD and Blu-ray of this movie was released on 6 November 2015 in Japan by Bandai Visual.

See also
 Yoshito Usui

References

2015 anime films
2015 films
My Moving Story! Cactus Large Attack!
Toho animated films
Films about plants